Nyagua was a Mende chief  from Sierra Leone.

Early life and career
Nyagua was born in the early 1800 in Kenema in the Eastern Province of Sierra Leone. Nyagua ruled a great realm, covering much of the territory between modern Kenema and Sefadu in the Eastern Province. He conquered many outlying districts to enlarge his domain, but some came voluntarily under his control. Nyagua built up an impressive capital at Panguma, and is said to have possessed a vast number of slaves and about four hundred wives. As British power increased in the Sierra Leone hinterland, Nyagua realised that he did not have the strength to resist it. He therefore co-operated with the British on several occasions by signing a treaty of friendship, capturing warriors who had raided a customs post, and sending a son to be educated in Freetown.

But Nyagua saw himself as a friend, and not a vassal or servant of the British. He was the chief  of a small allied state, and felt that he deserved the respect of a sovereign ruler. When a travelling British Commissioner called Nyagua to a meeting abruptly at his own convenience, the Mende chief refused to attend; and when the British Governor sent an "order", Nyagua replied that he must take up the matter with his elders first as custom required. British officials began to see Nyagua as arrogant and troublesome, despite his obvious co-operation; and when the 1898 Rebellion erupted, led by Temne chief Bai Bureh the British ordered his immediate arrest.

Nyagua had commanded his people to remain at peace for their own protection, and his followers attacked the British only after the arrest of their chief. Nyagua was taken to Freetown on "suspicion of disloyalty" and sent along with Bai Bureh into exile in the Gold Coast (now Ghana) from which he never returned to his homeland, instead he died in the Gold Coast.

Even the British officials acknowledged that Nyagua had committed no hostile act, but they felt his influence was too strong for him to remain a chief in their new Protectorate. He was among the last of Sierra Leone's independent warrior-chiefs.

External links
Nyagua, The British, and the Hut Tax War
Arthur Abraham
The International Journal of African Historical Studies, Vol. 5, No. 1 (1972), pp. 94–98
 
Sierra Leone heroes 

Mende people
Hut Tax War of 1898
People from Kenema